Martha Mayer Erlebacher ( – ) was an American painter. She attended Gettysburg College from 1955 to 1956. She received a BA in Industrial Design from the Pratt Institute. She also received an MFA from Pratt in 1963. She is known for her trompe-l'œil still lifes and well as her representational figurative work of the nude body. She was influenced by eighteenth- and nineteenth-century Italian and French painting traditions and well as by the realist Thomas Eakins.

As a leading American realistic artist, she has exhibited her work over the past four decades at renowned art galleries in New York, Chicago, and Philadelphia.

Erlebacher's work was used on the cover of The Figure: Painting Drawing and Sculpture, Contemporary Perspectives (2014).

Notes and references

Further reading 

 Galassi, Susan.  "Martha Mayer Erlebacher" Arts Magazine, Vol 54, March 1980, p. 23.
 Lubell, Ellen.  "In Praise of the Figure:  The Paintings of Martha Mayer Erlebacher"  Arts Magazine, Vol 53, October 1978, p 138-141
 Cohen, Ronny. "Martha Mayer Erlebacher." Artforum International  32(5):(1994): p93-
 
 

1937 births
2013 deaths
20th-century American women artists
20th-century American painters
Artists from Jersey City, New Jersey
Gettysburg College alumni
Pratt Institute alumni
Trompe-l'œil artists
21st-century American painters
21st-century American women